Nina Brown Hamilton (January 21, 1915 – April 22, 2018) was a British–American tennis player.

Biography
Brown was born in Uxbridge and grew up on the outskirts of London, attending Notting Hill and Ealing High School. Her often doubles partner Rita Jarvis was one of her classmates. In 1939, she was a mixed doubles finalist at the Wimbledon Championships (with Frank Wilde) and played doubles on the Wightman Cup team. World War II broke out while she was in the United States for the Wightman Cup and she became stranded in her host country. She ended up taking a hostess job at a winter resort in Arizona, where she met Yale graduate Ray Hamilton, who she married in 1941. Raising four children, Brown spent the remainder of her life in St Louis, Missouri, and lived to the age of 103.

Grand Slam finals

Mixed doubles (1 runner-up)

References

1915 births
2018 deaths
British female tennis players
English female tennis players
English emigrants to the United States
Tennis people from Greater London
American centenarians
Women centenarians